Kudrjaschevia  is a genus of plants in the  Lamiaceae, first described in 1953. It is native to mountainous regions of south-central Asia.

Species
Kudrjaschevia grubovii Kochk. - Tajikistan
Kudrjaschevia jacubii (Lipsky) Pojark. - Tajikistan, Afghanistan, Kyrgyzstan
Kudrjaschevia korshinskyi (Lipsky) Pojark. - Tajikistan, Afghanistan
Kudrjaschevia nadinae (Lipsky) Pojark. - Tajikistan
Kudrjaschevia pojarkovae Ikonn. - Tajikistan

References

Lamiaceae
Lamiaceae genera